Streptomyces gamaensis is a bacterium species from the genus of Streptomyces which has been isolated from soil from Gama in Chad. Streptomyces gamaensis has an antifungal activity.

See also 
 List of Streptomyces species

References 

gamaensis
Bacteria described in 2017